Stepan Semyonovich Kutorga (12 February 1805 – 25 April 1861) was a Russian naturalist, zoologist and mineralogist who worked as a professor at the Saint Petersburg Imperial University.

Kutorga was born in Mstislav, Mogilev Governorate, son of Semyon Martynovich, and received his early education at home. He studied medicine and received a doctor of medicine degree in 1832 with a dissertation "De organis vocis psittaci erytaci" ["the voice organs of the African grey parrot"]. In 1833 he obtained the chair of zoology at Saint Petersburg University, and from 1848 he also taught mineralogy. He published several works on anatomy and was a popularizer of natural history. In 1860 he was among the first Russians to favourably comment on Charles Darwin's ideas on evolution. After his death, he was succeeded in his position at the university by his student Karl Kessler.

References

External links 
 De organis vocis et loquelae psittaci erithaci (1832 dissertation)

1805 births
1861 deaths
People from Mstsislaw
19th-century zoologists from the Russian Empire
Mineralogists from the Russian Empire
Paleontologists from the Russian Empire
Recipients of the Order of St. Anna, 2nd class
Cartographers from the Russian Empire
Demidov Prize laureates
Academic staff of Saint Petersburg State University